Savran may refer to:

 Savran Raion, a former district of Odessa Oblast, Ukraine
 Savran, Savran, Odessa Oblast, an urban-type settlement in the district
 Savran River, a river in Ukraine, tributary of Southern Bug
 Savran (Hasidic dynasty), from Savran, Ukraine
 Šavrane, a village in the municipality of Kruševac, Serbia
 Savran, Çivril
 Savran, Gölbaşı, a village in the district of Gölbaşı, Adıyaman Province, Turkey
 Savran, Sinanpaşa, a village in the district of Sinanpaşa, Afyonkarahisar Province, Turkey

See also
 Savrandere, Aydın, a village in the district of Aydın, Aydın Province, Turkey
 Sawran (disambiguation)